Atakan Müjde (born 25 October 2003) is a Turkish footballer who plays as a midfielder for Yeni Malatyaspor.

Career
A youth product of Pendikspor, Müjde began his senior career with the club in the TFF Second League in 2020. He transferred to Yeni Malatyaspor on 31 January 2021, and was then loaned back to Pendikspor to finish the season. He made his professional debut with Yeni Malayaspor in a 1–0 Süper Lig loss to İstanbul Başakşehir on 4 April 2022.

International career
Müjde was called up to a training camp for the Turkey U18s in June 2021.

References

External links
 
 

2003 births
Living people
Sportspeople from Adapazarı
Turkish footballers
Association football midfielders
Pendikspor footballers
Yeni Malatyaspor footballers
Süper Lig players
TFF Second League players